Saša Kolman (born 1 May 1984 in Slovenia) is a Slovenian retired footballer.

References

Slovenian footballers
Living people
Slovenian football managers
Association football defenders
NK Nafta Lendava players
NK Primorje players
FC Suðuroy players
1984 births
Deportivo Rayo Cantabria players